Piscivorin is a component of snake venom secreted by the Eastern Cottonmouth (Agkistrodon piscivorus piscivorus). It is a member of the cysteine-rich secretory protein (CRISP) family, which blocks voltage-dependent calcium channels.

Etymology 
The name of piscivorin comes from the snake species name piscivorus, which is derived from the Latin words pisces and vorare, meaning 'fish' and 'to devour' respectively.

Sources 
Piscivorin is produced in the venom glands of the Eastern Cottonmouth snake (Agkistrodon piscivorus piscivorus), which populates the Eastern United States.  Typically, crude venom from the Eastern Cottonmouth contains approximately 1.25% of piscivorin.

Biochemistry 
Piscivorin belongs to the cysteine-rich secretory protein (CRISP) family, which are secreted as single-chain proteins with molecular masses between 20 and 30 kDa. They display significant amino acid sequence homology. Sixteen cysteine residues, forming 8 disulfide bonds, are strictly conserved in CRISPs.  Ten of these cysteine residues are clustered into the C-terminal part of the protein.

The molecular mass of piscivorin is 24.842 kDa. The nucleotide sequence of piscivorin cDNA spans 1323 bp, containing an open reading frame of 240 codons.

Piscivorin has the following amino acid sequence.

Target and mode of action 
Piscivorin reduces high potassium-evoked smooth muscle contraction, but does not inhibit caffeine-stimulated contraction of smooth muscle. Since caffeine normally causes contraction through the release of Ca2+ from the sarcoplasmic reticulum, this differential effect indicates that piscivorin is an L-type calcium channel blocker. At a concentration of 1 μM, its effect on depolarization-induced smooth muscle contraction is weaker than of the related CRISP family toxins ablomin, triflin or latisemin. A sequence comparison of piscivorin and other CRISP family proteins suggests that the Glu186 residue is the crucial site for the blocking of the calcium channels.

Unlike some other CRISP family proteins, piscivorin does not block cyclic nucleotide-gated channels.

References 

Vertebrate toxins
Ion channel toxins